Topol is a small settlement west of the village of Ravnik in the Municipality of Bloke in the Inner Carniola region of Slovenia.

References

External links
Topol on Geopedia

Populated places in the Municipality of Bloke